Khaneqah (also Romanized as Khāneqāh) is a village in Khanamrud Rural District, in the Central District of Heris County, East Azerbaijan Province, Iran. At the 2006 census, its population was 420, in 97 families.

References 

Populated places in Heris County